Wissen is a town in the district of Altenkirchen, in Rhineland-Palatinate, Germany. It is situated on the river Sieg, approximately 12 km northeast of Altenkirchen.

Wissen is the seat of the Verbandsgemeinde ("collective municipality") Wissen.

History
The name Wissen was first appeared in the records in 1013 in a document now in the State Archives of Hanover. The original settlement was founded in 1048 during the second period of settlement in the woodland clearings on the perimeter of the Archbishopric of Cologne and was called "Wisnerofanc".

The lords of Arenberg, burgraves of Electoral Cologne, were given territorial lordship in 1176. After the family died out in 1280, the Archbishopric of Cologne acquired the parish of Wissen on the left bank of the river Sieg as a redeemed fief. That part of the parish on the right hand side of the Sieg remained in the hands of the lords of Wildenburg, whose Werther line of the House of Hatzfeld later also gained that part of Wissen on the left bank as a fief.

In 1803-1815 the two halves of the parish went to Nassau; later they were united under Prussian reign and Wissen became the seat of a Bürgermeisterei. In the 19th century, its communications links were considerably improved and bigger industries moved to Wissen. On 19 April 1969, Wissen received town rights.  The incorporation of the three hitherto independent municipalities Elbergrund, Köttingerhöhe and Schönstein followed on 7 June 1969.

  Population growth
The table below shows the growth of the population from 1871-1987 based on censuses.

 Data source: Statistisches Landesamt Rheinland-Pfalz

References

Altenkirchen (district)